Robert Gordon University RFC is a rugby union club based in Aberdeen, Scotland. The club operates a men's team and a women's team. Both currently play in the university leagues.

History

They play Aberdeen University RFC in a local derby match known as the Granite City Challenge.

Sides

The men's team has a 1st and 2nd XV.

Both men and women train at the Woodside Sports Complex.

Honours

Men

 Scottish Conference 2A
 Champions (1): 2009-10
 Scottish Conference 3A
 Champions (1): 2014-15
 Scottish Conference 3B
 Champions (1): 2007-08

Women

 Scottish Conference 2A
 Champions (1): 2016-17

References

Rugby union in Aberdeen
Scottish rugby union teams
University and college rugby union clubs in Scotland